The following is an overview of the events of 1886 in film, including a list of notable flims

Events

Louis Le Prince is granted an American dual-patent on a 16-lens device that combines a motion picture camera with a projector.

Births

Film by year
Film